Thomas N. Sherratt, known as Tom, is a professor of evolutionary ecology at Carleton University, Canada. He is known for his research on camouflage, aposematism and mimicry.

Life
Sherratt read his bachelor's degree at the University of Edinburgh, and gained his Ph.D. at the University of Dundee. He states that the two main themes in his research laboratory are the evolution of surprising traits in behaviour and morphology, including co-operation with unrelated individuals (as opposed to kin selection) and the existence of conspicuous warning signals; and the way that individual behaviour shapes the spatio-temporal dynamics of populations, as when travelling waves are set up when individuals move over a landscape feature.

Work
Sherratt has contributed to more than 100 papers in major journals. His co-written 2004 book Avoiding Attack on camouflage, aposematism and mimicry has been cited at least 1175 times, while his co-written papers "Development of cooperative relationships through increasing investment" and "Evidence of intra-specific competition for food in a pelagic seabird" have each been cited over 300 times.

Books
 Sherratt, T. N.; Wilkinson, D. M. (2009). Big Questions in Ecology and Evolution. Oxford University Press.
 Ruxton Graeme D., Sherratt, T. N.; Speed, M. P. (2004). Avoiding attack: the evolutionary ecology of crypsis, warning signals and mimicry. Oxford University Press.

References

Year of birth missing (living people)
Living people
Scottish ecologists
Alumni of the University of Dundee
Alumni of the University of Edinburgh
Academic staff of Carleton University
Camouflage researchers